Statistics of the Primera División de México for the 1983–84 season.

Overview
It was contested by 20 teams, and América won the championship.

Unión de Curtidores was promoted from Segunda División 1982-83 season, and was relegated from Primera División on this season.

Atlante F.C. was moved from Estadio Azteca to Estadio Azulgrana.

Teams

Group stage

Group 1

Group 2

Group 3

Group 4

Results

Playoff

References
Mexico - List of final tables (RSSSF)

Liga MX seasons
Mex
1983–84 in Mexican football